Harold Leman Spears (December 31, 1919 – December 6, 1944) was an American combat pilot who was a United States Marine Corps fighter ace during World War II.

See also
 Robert M. Hanson 
 Donald N. Aldrich

References

External links

1919 births
1944 deaths
American World War II flying aces
Aviators from Ohio
Aviators killed in aviation accidents or incidents in the United States
United States Marine Corps officers
United States Marine Corps pilots of World War II
United States Naval Aviators
United States Marine Corps personnel killed in World War II